Ponuga is a corregimiento in Santiago District, Veraguas Province, Panama with a population of 2,798 as of 2010. Its population as of 1990 was 3,369; its population as of 2000 was 3,096.

References

Corregimientos of Veraguas Province